The Lancaster House conferences were three meetings (1960, 1962, 1963) in which Kenya's constitutional framework and independence were negotiated.

The first conference was under the chairmanship of Secretary of State for the Colonies Iain Macleod in January 1960. There was no agreement, and Macleod issued an interim constitution.

The second conference commenced in February 1962, and a framework for self-governance was negotiated.

The 1963 conference finalized constitutional arrangements for Kenya's independence as a Dominion, marking the end of more than 70 years of colonial rule. In all three meetings, Prime Minister Harold Macmillan ordered that the interests of the white settlers in Kenya effectively be ignored, and that the British government continue negotiations until "real and complete independence for Kenya" could be established. This led to some anger from within elements of the British Conservative Party who wanted Britain to find an arrangement that would postpone independence.(1963 Constitution of Kenya)

See also

Fitz Remedios Santana de Souza

References

Sources

 , essay on Iain Macleod written by David Goldsworthy.
Perilous journey to freedom
Historical background to law review squabbles

Politics of Kenya
History of Kenya
1960 in Kenya
British Kenya
Kenya–United Kingdom relations
1962 in Kenya
1963 in Kenya

1960 conferences
1962 conferences
1963 conferences
1960 in the United Kingdom
1962 in the United Kingdom
1963 in the United Kingdom
1960 in international relations
1962 in international relations
1963 in international relations
1960s in the City of Westminster
Kenya and the Commonwealth of Nations
United Kingdom and the Commonwealth of Nations